Ibraahin Hassan Addow (died December 3, 2009) was a Somali scholar and politician.

Biography
Addow was the head of the Foreign Affairs department for the Islamic Courts Union (ICU) of Somalia. He lived in the United States and worked as an administrator at the American University in Washington, D.C., before returning to his native Somalia in 1999. There, he served as the Dean of Benadir University in Mogadishu, and represented the ICU in its ongoing discussions in Khartoum and Nairobi with the Somali Transitional Federal Government.

On January 8, 2007, as the Battle of Ras Kamboni raged, Prof. Addow, speaking from Yemen, said the Islamic Courts was ready to enter negotiations with the Transitional Federal Government. However, TFG President Abdullahi Yusuf Ahmed categorically refused to hold peace talks at this stage.

Death
On December 3, 2009, Professor Addow was killed in an explosion during a graduation ceremony at the Shamo Hotel in Mogadishu, Somalia.

References

Year of birth missing
2009 deaths
Deaths by suicide bomber
Terrorism deaths in Somalia
Assassinated Somalian politicians
Somalian murder victims
People murdered in Somalia
2009 murders in Somalia